Nicklas Robert Wiberg (born April 16, 1985 in Stockholm) is a male decathlete from Sweden. He set his personal best score (8406 points) in the men's decathlon on August 20, 2009 in Berlin.

Profile
Height: 6ft5in
Weight: 210 lbs
Main events: Decathlon, Indoor Heptathlon, 1500m, 5000m, 3000m steeplechase, 5 km road, 15 km road, Javelin throw

Achievements

References

1985 births
Living people
Swedish decathletes
Athletes from Stockholm